The Inspector General (Czech: Revizor) is a 1933 Czech historical comedy film directed by Martin Frič and starring Vlasta Burian, Jaroslav Marvan and Václav Trégl. It is an adaptation of the 1836 play The Inspector General by Nikolai Gogol. The director Martin Frič considered it one of his best movies.

The film's sets were designed by the art director Štěpán Kopecký. It was shot in studios in Prague.

Plot summary

Cast
 Vlasta Burian as Ivan Alexandrovic Chlestakov
 Jaroslav Marvan as Mayor Anton Antonovich Skvoznik-Dmukhanovsky
 Václav Trégl as Servant Josef
 Josef Vošalík as Pyotr Ivanovich Bobchinsky
 Alois Dvorský as Pyotr Ivanovich Dobchinsky
 Josef Rovenský as Postmaster Ivan Kuzmich Shpekin
 Frantisek Cerný as The Innkeeper
 Theodor Pištěk as Judge Amos Fyodorovich Lyapkin-Tyapkin
 Frantisek Hlavatý as School Commissioner
 Zdeňka Baldová as Anna Andreyevna Skvoznik-Dmukhanovskaya 
 Ella Nollová as Prayer 
 Josef Gruss as Mayor's servant 
 Ferdinand Jarkovský as Waiter 
 Eman Fiala as Greengrocer 
 Jan Marek as Teacher 
 Jan W. Speerger as Chief of Police 
 Václav Menger as School guardian Chlopov 
 Truda Grosslichtová as Maria Antonovna Skvoznik-Dmukhanovskaya

See also
 The Inspector General (1949 film)

References

Bibliography
 Goble, Alan. The Complete Index to Literary Sources in Film. Walter de Gruyter, 1999.

External links
 
 

1933 films
1930s historical comedy films
Czechoslovak black-and-white films
Films based on The Government Inspector
Films directed by Martin Frič
Films shot in Prague
Films set in the 19th century
Czech historical comedy films
Czech films based on plays
Czechoslovak comedy films
1933 comedy films
1930s Czech films
1930s Czech-language films